Anne L. Mactavish is a Canadian jurist who is a judge of the Federal Court of Appeal.

Early life and education 
Born in Montreal, Quebec, Canada, Mactavish was educated at Bishop's University, the University of New Brunswick, and the University of Ottawa. She was called to the Bar of Ontario in 1982.  She became an Associate and Partner at Perley-Robertson, Panet, Hill & McDougall from 1982 to 1996.  She was appointed President of the Human Rights Tribunal Panel in 1995, and Chairperson of the Canadian Human Rights Tribunal in 1998. (The rules stipulate that the Chairperson of the Canadian Human Rights Tribunal be appointed for a term of not more than seven years.) Mactavish was also President of the County of Carleton Law Association.

As of January 2009, she was President of the Canadian Institute for the Administration of Justice. 

Mactavist was appointed a judge of the Federal Court and a member ex officio of the Federal Court of Appeal on November 19, 2003. She was appointed as a judge of the Court Martial Appeal Court of Canada on March 23, 2004.

Mactavish was elevated to the Court of Appeal on June 22, 2019.

Ruling regarding Nuremberg Principle IV

Justice Mactavish has taken a role in hearing at least two well publicized cases: those of Jeremy Hinzman and Robin Long. They were both Iraq War Resisters who claimed that the international law Nuremberg Principle IV put them under legal obligation to avoid participating in the invasion of Iraq and the Iraq war.  In order to avoid the punishment for desertion which they would face if they returned to the United States, they applied for refugee status in Canada.

When Mactavish ruled against Jeremy Hinzman's application for refugee status on March 31, 2006, there was the following press coverage: Coverage included the following criticism from Alex Neve, who taught international human rights and refugee law at Osgoode Hall Law School, and who was appointed an Officer of the Order of Canada, in honour of his human rights work.:

Mactavish's ruling against Jeremy Hinzman also later drew the following criticism from Lawrence Hill in the Ottawa Citizen:

Sadly, Canadian courts and the Immigration and Refugee Board have danced around the question of whether deserters from the U.S. forces should not be compelled to take part in an illegal war. When she ruled against Jeremy Hinzman last year, Justice Anne Mactavish of the Federal Court of Canada wrote: "the question of whether the American-led military intervention in Iraq is in fact illegal is not before the Court, and no finding has been made in this regard."

That quote from Mactavish referred to the earlier decision of Brian P. Goodman to disallow evidence concerning the legality of the Iraq war in the Hinzman case:  That earlier ruling by Goodman had been covered by the Toronto Star with this statement:

After the Mactavish ruling against Hinzman on March 31, 2006, the case was appealed to the Supreme Court of Canada. But on November 15, 2007, a Coram of the Supreme Court of Canada made of Justices Michel Bastarache, Rosalie Abella, and Louise Charron refused an application to have the Court hear the Hinzman case on appeal, without giving reasons.

In the later similar case of Robin Long on July 14, 2008, "Madam Justice Anne Mactavish of the Federal Court of Canada cleared the way for [Long's] deportation..." Robin Long was the first U.S. soldier to be deported from Canada to the United States.

See also
Alex Neve
Mactavish ruling on Jeremy Hinzman in the context of Canada and Iraq War Resisters
Federal Court
Jeremy Hinzman
Nuremberg Principle IV
Robin Long

References

External links
  Court Martial Appeal Court of Canada - biography of Anne Mactavish

People from Montreal
Living people
Judges of the Federal Court of Canada
Canadian women judges
Judges of the Court Martial Appeal Court of Canada
Year of birth missing (living people)